The San Francisco Cannabis Buyers Club was the first public marijuana dispensary in the United States.

History

The San Francisco Cannabis Buyers Club was founded in 1994. The location of the dispensary was previously an existing cannabis collective that was run by Thomas O'Malley until 1992. In the wake of the success of Proposition P which passed in 1991, it began operating at the location after the death of O'Malley. Prior to being legalized under California law, the club was at Ford and Sanchez Street in San Francisco. Still subject to legal hassles after that date, it eventually changed its name to "Cannabis Cultivators Club" and even "Cannabis Heating Club".

The club was formed by John Entwistle and Dennis Peron, widely credited as the "Father of Medical Marijuana." It began as a way to dispense marijuana to patients with HIV/AIDS and led to the founders co-authoring 1996 California Proposition 215 for legalization of medical marijuana in California.

Operations

The club operated out of several floors at its location in San Francisco. The location was described as something similar to a coffee house with couches, chairs, and coffee tables. It had a menu which included edibles and loose marijuana. Membership in the club exceeded 8,000 at one point and membership required a doctor's note certifying the patient had AIDS, cancer, or other condition which marijuana could be used to alleviate pain.

References

Medicinal use of cannabis organizations based in the United States
Culture of San Francisco
Cannabis in California
Organizations established in 1992
1992 in cannabis
Cannabis dispensaries in the United States